Qarzi or Qarezi may refer to:
 Qarzi, North Khorasan
 Qarzi Karji, North Khorasan Province